Kho (meaning "to braise", "to stew", or "to simmer") or khor is a cooking technique in Vietnamese and Cambodian cuisine, where a protein source such as fish, shrimp, poultry, pork, beef, or fried tofu is braised on low heat in a mixture of fish sauce, sugar, and water or a water substitute such as young coconut juice. The resulting dish is salty and savory, and meant to be eaten with rice noodles, baguette, or steamed rice.

Particular dishes

Beef stew is called bò kho or thịt bò kho and fish stew is called cá kho or cá kho tộ (tộ referring to the clay pot in which the dish is cooked). For fish stew, catfish is preferred, particularly in southern Vietnam. Chicken stew, called gà kho or gà kho gừng (gừng meaning "ginger"), is less popular. Vegetarian stew may also be prepared.

See also
 Brining
 Jorim
 List of stews

References

Cambodian cuisine
Vietnamese cuisine
Stews
Salted foods